A lieutenant governor, lieutenant-governor, or vice governor is a high officer of state, whose precise role and rank vary by jurisdiction. Often a lieutenant governor is the deputy, or lieutenant, to or ranked under a governor — a "second-in-command", rather like deputy governor. In Canadian provinces and in the Dutch Caribbean, the lieutenant governor is the representative of the monarch in that jurisdiction, and thus outranks the head of government but for practical purposes has virtually no power.

In India, lieutenant governors are in charge of special administrative divisions in that country.

In the United States, lieutenant governors are usually second-in-command to a state governor, and the actual power held by the lieutenant governor varies greatly from state to state. The lieutenant governor is often first in line of succession to the governorship, and acts as governor when the governor leaves the state or is unable to serve. Also, the lieutenant governor is often the president of the state senate.

In Argentina, lieutenant governors are called "vice governors" and are modeled after the U.S. lieutenant governors, since as their U.S. counterpart the vice governors are the second-in-command to a provincial governor, and are the first in the gubernatorial line of succession. Also, the vice governor usually acts as the president of the provincial senate (or the provincial legislature in unicameral provinces).

Lieutenant governors in the former British Empire
Australia – Lieutenant-Governor (Australia)
Lieutenant-Governor of New South Wales
Lieutenant-Governor of Queensland
Lieutenant-Governor of Victoria
Canada – Lieutenant Governor (Canada)
Lieutenant Governor of Alberta
Lieutenant Governor of British Columbia 
Lieutenant Governor of Manitoba 
Lieutenant Governor of New Brunswick
Lieutenant Governor of Newfoundland and Labrador
Lieutenant Governor of Nova Scotia
Lieutenant Governor of Ontario
Lieutenant Governor of Prince Edward Island 
Lieutenant Governor of Quebec 
Lieutenant Governor of Saskatchewan
British Crown Dependencies and other possessions
Guernsey – Lieutenant Governor of Guernsey
Isle of Man – Lieutenant Governor of the Isle of Man
Jersey – Lieutenant Governor of Jersey
Hong Kong (historical) – Lieutenant Governor of Hong Kong (1843–1902)
Indonesia (historical) – Lieutenant-Governor of Java (1811–1814)
India – Governors and Lieutenant-Governors of states of India
List of Governors of Indian states
 List of Lieutenant Governors of the North-Western Provinces
 List of Lieutenant Governors of the United Provinces of Agra and Oudh
 List of Lieutenant Governors of the North-Western Provinces and Chief Commissioners of Oudh
New Zealand – The only person to have held the rank of Lieutenant Governor of New Zealand was Royal Navy Captain William Hobson from 1839 to 1841 when New Zealand colony was a dependency of the colony of New South Wales, governed at that time by Sir George Gipps. When New Zealand was designated a Crown colony in 1841, Hobson was raised to the rank of governor, which he held until his death the following year. Subsequently, in 1848 New Zealand was divided into three provinces: New Ulster, New Munster, and New Leinster, each with their own Lieutenant Governors.
Nigeria - known as Deputy Governor
U.S. states – Lieutenant governor (United States)
List of current United States lieutenant governors
Colonial government in the Thirteen Colonies#The Council

Lieutenant governors in the Kingdom of the Netherlands
Lieutenant governors of the former Dutch constituent country of Netherlands Antilles acted as head of the governing council of the island territories, which formed a level of decentral government until the dissolution of the Netherlands Antilles in 2010. Currently the Netherlands has a lieutenant governor overseeing each of the three special municipalities in the Caribbean Netherlands – Saba, Bonaire, and Sint Eustatius – where their function is similar to a mayor in the European Netherlands.

See also
Acting governor
Administrator of the government
Deputy governor
Governor-general
Governor-in-chief
Lieutenant Governor's Court
Regent
Vice president

References

Gubernatorial titles
Governor
Vice offices